Denby is a civil parish in the Amber Valley district of Derbyshire, England.  The parish contains nine listed buildings that are recorded in the National Heritage List for England.  Of these, one is listed at Grade I, the highest of the three grades, two are at Grade II*, the middle grade, and the others are at Grade II, the lowest grade.  The parish contains the village of Denby and the surrounding area.  The listed buildings consist of a church, a tombstone and a war memorial in the churchyard, farmhouses and associated structures, and a milepost.


Key

Buildings

References

Citations

Sources

 

Lists of listed buildings in Derbyshire